is a passenger railway station in located in the city of Higashiōsaka,  Osaka Prefecture, Japan, operated by the private railway operator Kintetsu Railway.

Lines
Nukata Station is served by the Nara Line, and is located 9.0 rail kilometers from the starting point of the line at Fuse Station and 15.1 kilometers from Ōsaka Namba Station.

Station layout
The station consists of two opposed side platforms, which are not interconnected. Passengers wishing to change platforms must exit the station and re-enter from the other side.

Platforms

Adjacent stations

History
Nukata Station opened on July 13, 1920 as a station of Osaka Electric Tramway. In 1941 it was transferred to the Kansai Kyūkō Railway, which became part of Kintetsu in 1944.

Passenger statistics
In fiscal 2018, the station was used by an average of 3,490 passengers daily.

Surrounding area
Nakuda Sanso
Hiraoka Park
Myotoku-ji
Higashi Osaka Municipal Hiraoka Higashi Elementary School

See also
List of railway stations in Japan

References

External links

 Nukata Station 

Railway stations in Osaka Prefecture
Railway stations in Japan opened in 1920
Higashiōsaka